(born November 14, 1955 in Kurume, Fukuoka) of Japan is a former professional track racing cyclist and ten-consecutive-time world champion in track cycling sprint. He is among the best track sprinters of modern times. From 1977 to 1986, he won an unprecedented 10 consecutive gold medals in professional sprint events at the UCI track world Championships. He was one of the most successful competitors of all-time on the Japanese professional keirin circuit.

Video game 

Nakano Kōichi Kanshū: Keirin Ō

King Keirin ( 競輪王 ) is a track cycling racing simulation game endorsed by Koichi Nakano, originally created by Coconuts Japan Entertainment ( ココナッツジャパンエンターテイメント), and released by Super Nintendo Entertainment System in 1994.

 is a cycling video game that allows the player to control the daily life of a professional cycling athlete.

As the title says, it was supervised by Kōichi Nakano.

Gameplay
The player must make daily life decisions while training for the next event. The game starts on April 1, 1994, with a 20-year-old rider. However, he will advance in years as the player progresses in his career and partakes in the events of the cycling season. Players can earn up to 1,000,000,000 yen ($11,068,367.11 in American dollars) and give their rider a name in either hiragana or katakana.

In the actual competition, the player must watch himself try to beat eight other cyclists for the race win. Nine cyclists race against each other in a velodrome and they compete for money and a championship. It is unknown whether the game makes the player retire at 45 years of age like in most modern titles or not. Riders are not always traveling at full speed or at a specific radius; making a balance between aggressive riding and passive riding a must.

See also
 UCI Track Cycling World Championships – Men's sprint

References

External links

Japanese male cyclists
1955 births
Living people
People from Kurume
UCI Track Cycling World Champions (men)
Keirin cyclists
Recipients of the Medal with Purple Ribbon
Japanese track cyclists
Coconuts Japan games